Vereda is a subdivisional administrative part of a municipality in Colombia.

Subdivisions of Colombia